The 1938 Ohio gubernatorial election was held on November 8, 1938. Republican nominee John W. Bricker defeated Democratic nominee Charles W. Sawyer with 52.45% of the vote.

General election

Candidates
John W. Bricker, Republican 
Charles W. Sawyer, Democratic

Results

References

1938
Ohio
Gubernatorial